Lyudmila Gubkina (born 13 August 1973 in Navapolatsk, Vitsebsk Voblast) is a Belarusian hammer thrower. Her personal best is 69.92 metres, achieved in August 2000 in Minsk.

Achievements

External links

1973 births
Living people
Belarusian female hammer throwers
Athletes (track and field) at the 2000 Summer Olympics
Olympic athletes of Belarus
Universiade medalists in athletics (track and field)
Universiade silver medalists for Belarus
Universiade bronze medalists for Belarus
Competitors at the 1997 Summer Universiade
Medalists at the 2001 Summer Universiade
Medalists at the 1999 Summer Universiade